William Henry "Rock" Glosson (January 18, 1937 – October 9, 1996) was an American gridiron football player, coach of football and golf, and college athletics administrator.  He was the seventh head football coach at Mississippi Valley State College—now known as Mississippi Valley State University—in Itta Bena, Mississippi, serving for two seasons, from 1968 to 1969, and compiling a record of 2–15. He was the athletic director at his alma mater, Texas Southern University, from 1980 to 1982.

A native of Philadelphia, Glosson played college football at Texas Southern, where he was a three-time all-Southwestern Athletic Conference (SWAC) end, from 1956 to 1959.  He played Canadian football professionally for one season, in 1959, with the Montreal Alouettes of the Canadian Football League (CFL).  He was an assistant football coach at Texas Southern from 1961 to 1967.  After his head coaching stint at Mississippi Valley State, Glosson returned to Texas Southern again in 1970 as assistant athletic director, assistant football coach, and head golf coach.

Glosson was married to Rose Walker.

Head coaching record

References

External links
 

1937 births
1996 deaths
American football ends
Canadian football ends
Montreal Alouettes players
Mississippi Valley State Delta Devils football coaches
Texas Southern Tigers athletic directors
Texas Southern Tigers football coaches
Texas Southern Tigers football players
College golf coaches in the United States
Players of American football from Philadelphia
Players of Canadian football from Philadelphia
African-American coaches of American football
African-American players of American football
African-American players of Canadian football
20th-century African-American sportspeople